Ong River is a tributary of Mahanadi river.

Nearby rivers to Ong river: Tel Nadi  , Gorkha Nadi , Subarnarekha River/Swarnarekha River , Godavari , Manairu Vagu .

References 

Tributaries of the Mahanadi River
Rivers of Odisha
Rivers of India